Rhizaxinella is a genus of sponges belonging to the family Suberitidae.

The genus has almost cosmopolitan distribution.

Species:

Rhizaxinella arborescens 
Rhizaxinella australiensis 
Rhizaxinella biseta

References

Suberitidae
Sponge genera